Yoram Harth (Hebrew: יורם הרט; born 27 August 1958) is an Israeli dermatologist and inventor. He co-invented blue light acne vulgaris phototherapy,

as well as a radio frequency device for home treatment for wrinkle reduction.

Harth was the founder, President, and Medical Director of CureLight Medical Ltd.
 

 He was the Chief Medical Officer and the founder of Endymed Medical Ltd.
and he is now the co-founder and medical director of MDacne.

Biography
Yoram Harth's father was a physician who specialised in internal medicine.
Harth is a magna cum laude graduate of the Sackler School of Medicine in Tel Aviv University (1982).
Harth received his Dermatology training in the department of Dermatology at Rambam Medical School in Haifa and served as a research fellow in the department of Dermatology at the Columbia – Presbyterian Medical center in New York City.

He co-founded the Phototherapy Unit, Rambam Medical center, and was Director of the Photodynamic Therapy Unit, Elisha Medical Center in Haifa.
Harth served on the faculty of American Academy of Dermatology (AAD) as part of the Photobiology training team
 and the American Society for Laser Medicine and Surgery (ASLMS).

Harth holds several patents and has authored a number of papers and book chapters.

Scientific and business activity
Starting in 1998 Harth co-founded Curelight, an Israeli company, and developed Clearlight, an acne phototherapy therapy system.

Curelight was chosen by the Israeli Venture Capital Association as Best Startup company of 2002 (Medical Devices). Curelight was a finalist in the contest Entrepreneur of the year 2003, (Ernst & Young, Israel).

Harth was also a pioneer in the development of other novel devices for dermatological treatment, among them the patented invention in the field of targeted multi–wavelength phototherapy for psoriasis and Vitiligo.

In 2007 Harth co-founded Endymed Medical and Israeli company specializing in multisource radiofrequency devices for the professional and home use markets. Harth and his co-founder developed the first ever radiofrequency technology that uses 6 phase controlled generators. This technology allows multiple aesthetic treatments, including painless skin tightening and lifting for the face and body. Fraction of a RF skin resurfacing for skin rejuvenation, acne scars and stretch and more. Endymed's home use device was the world's first energy based RF device to be approved by the FDA for home use facial wrinkle reduction.

This device was a winner of the Edison Product innovation award for 2013. Endymed medical was the Europe fastest growing biomedical company in the Deloitte Touche Fast 500 list for 2013
and is traded on the Tel Aviv Stock Exchange (ENDY:TASE).

In 2017 Harth co-founded with Oded Harth, MDacne,  a company that uses computer vision and deep learning technologies to help people with acne. MDacne mobile app analyzes the user skin and provides FDA cleared anti-acne topical customized medications that are personalized to the user's skin type and acne condition.

In 2021 Oded Harth and Yoram Harth launched MDhair, a service that provides customized treatment for people with hair loss. 

The company is based in San Francisco and is backed by Khosla Ventures, Y Combinator  and SV Angel.

References 

Israeli healthcare managers
Israeli businesspeople
Israeli inventors
Israeli dermatologists
1958 births
Living people